The Tokko is a river in Yakutia, East Siberia, Russian Federation. It is the largest tributary of the Chara river in terms of length and area of its basin. It is navigable in its final stretch,  from its confluence with the Chara. Tokko village is located by the river bank. 

The Chara-Tokkinskaya group of deposits (Чара-Токкинская группа месторождений), the largest iron ore accumulation in Russia, is located in the Tokko basin.

The waters of the Tokko are rich in fish, including grayling, lenok, taimen, pike and common dace, among other species.

Course
The Tokko is a right tributary of the Chara, of the Lena basin.
In its upper course the Tokko flows northwards across the Olyokma-Chara Plateau in the Olyokminsky District through a U-shaped valley bound by smooth mountains. Finally it joins the Chara  from this river's mouth in the Olyokma. 

The river is frozen in most of its length between mid October and mid May, but there are places where  polynyas form. There are about 1,700 lakes in the basin area of the Tokko.

See also
List of rivers of Russia

References

Rivers of the Sakha Republic
Stanovoy Highlands